Nomi Eve (born 13 March 1968) is an American fiction writer. In 2001, her first novel, The Family Orchard was published by Alfred A. Knopf. A year later the paperback was published by Vintage. The first run was 100,000 copies.

In August 2014, her second novel "Henna House" was published by Scribners.

Eve is currently the Director of the Creative Writing MFA program at Drexel University.

References

External links
 Review of "The Family Orchard" from The BookReporter.com

1968 births
Living people
21st-century American novelists
American women novelists
21st-century American women writers
Drexel University faculty
Pennsylvania State University alumni
Brown University alumni
Jewish American writers
21st-century American Jews